Tawin "Tem" Hanprab (born 1 August 1998 in Nong Suea District, Pathum Thani Province) is a Thai taekwondo practitioner. He won the silver medal at the 2016 Summer Olympics Men's 58 kg.

References

External links

1998 births
Living people
Tawin Hanprab
Tawin Hanprab
Taekwondo practitioners at the 2014 Summer Youth Olympics
Taekwondo practitioners at the 2016 Summer Olympics
Tawin Hanprab
Medalists at the 2016 Summer Olympics
Tawin Hanprab
Olympic medalists in taekwondo
Universiade medalists in taekwondo
Tawin Hanprab
Southeast Asian Games medalists in taekwondo
Taekwondo practitioners at the 2018 Asian Games
Competitors at the 2017 Southeast Asian Games
Universiade bronze medalists for Thailand
Tawin Hanprab
Asian Taekwondo Championships medalists
Medalists at the 2017 Summer Universiade
Tawin Hanprab